Chelabad (also Romanized as Chelābād) is a village in Dasht-e Zarrin Rural District, in the Central District of Kuhrang County, Chaharmahal and Bakhtiari Province, Iran. At the 2006 census, its population was 19, in 4 families.

References 

Populated places in Kuhrang County